"Lately" is a song by the American soul singer Macy Gray. It is the first UK single from her fifth album The Sellout. The song was released on June 14, 2010, in the UK and the remixes EP followed on June 17, 2010. "Lately" was a success on the US Billboard Hot Dance Club Play chart, reaching the top ten.

Promotion
Gray performed the song on Later... with Jools Holland on May 26, 2010.

Critical reception
Entertainment Weekly's Simon Vozick-Levinson noted the song as one of its parent album's highlights, describing it as a "sleek disco cut."

Track listing
Remixes EP (released June 17, 2010)
"Lately" (Cutmore Remix) – 6:49
"Lately" (Nu Addiction Club Remix) – 6:40
"Lately" (True Tiger Remix) – 4:12
"Lately" (Sunship 2 Step Remix) – 4:48
"Lately" (Bros Rise Remix) – 3:01
"Lately" (Ruff Loaderz Club Remix) – 5:59
" Lately" DJ Alexia  (Alexia'Lately Remix)v- 3:40

Charts

References

2010 singles
Macy Gray songs
Songs written by Macy Gray
2009 songs